Chinese settlements in Tibet are colonies built by Chinese people in Tibet. Many Tibetan independence groups allege that the Chinese government has established these settlements in Tibet in an attempt to sinicize the region.

Context
One Tibetan administration formally declared its Independence in 1912 and was de facto independent until the People's Republic of China reasserted Chinese claims over the area in 1949.
The Office of Tibet in Washington D.C. made a statement that an alarming influx of Chinese migrants into Tibetan major cities is the cause of a deterioration of the region. The Office of Tibet then explains that these Chinese immigrants are influencing the culture of Tibet. This dates back to the so-called "major reform" of the regions' social, religious, political, and economic after the debated 1950 annexation of Tibet. Other than civilian migrants, the Chinese People's Liberation Army (PLA) also has occupation in Tibet, affecting population demographics. This influx of Chinese migrants goes back centuries, as the neighboring regions have had conflicts other than the current tensions. Another modern assimilation attempt of Tibet from China was during the Cultural Revolution movement. Another submovement of modern Tibetan immigration was through the Cadre Transfer Policy in the 1980's by the "Tibetan Party Committee". Although information regarding Chinese settlements is limited due to restricted traveling and reporting by foreigners, Tibetans find alternate ways to globally inform the world of current events, typically through external offices.

Motives
Largely, the accepted motive of the Chinese is to assimilate the Tibetan people to create a more homogenous country.

In 1991 the Dalai Lama declared:
 The new Chinese settlers have created an alternate society: a Chinese apartheid which, denying Tibetans equal social and economic status in our own land, threatens to finally overwhelm and absorb us.United States Congressional Serial Set, United States Government Printing Office, 1993, p. 110.

Another potential motive of Chinese settlements is to gain access to the once-protected Indian-Chinese border.

Chinese migrants are incentivized with major personal economic benefits. Publications report salary increases averaging at 71.8% of the migrant's previous salary. Monthly allowances are also provided, the amount fluctuating according to the migrant's residence "hardship level". Children of the Cadre Transfer Policy migrants are given priority job assignments.

This policy itself created an influx of chinese migrants as well, but this more focused approach was described as an attempt to promote economic development.

Another claim of the motive of the Chinese government is that the religious and social systems of tibet are not aligned with those of the Chinese government, and, again, to create a more homogenous region, creating migration to promote assimilation of Tibetans. The consequences of this religious homogenization, however, resulted in vandalization of Tibetan cultural institutes, like montestaries, nunneries, and temples.

Migration statistics
The Free Tibet Campaign in April 1996 made the unproven claim that 500,000 Chinese were to be moved into eastern Tibet to work in copper mines, a project that was to involve the building of several new mining towns.

In 1999 Lobsang Sangay, a leader of the Tibetan Youth Congress, alleged in the Harvard Asia Quarterly that 60-70% of the population in Lhasa now is Chinese and, outside of the traditional Tibetan "Barkhor" market, Tibetans own only 400-450 of the 3,500 to 4,000 shops. Han Chinese also occupy most government-related employment with 95 percent of official Chinese immigrants employed in state owned enterprises.

Although reports are highly censored and misrepresented, some statistics have been obtained. The Office of Tibet claims that misrepresentation currently is affected by a lack of residence permits held by migrants. The Office of Tibet also claims that militant occupation consists of "at least a quarter million", focused in the city of Lhasa. They claim that Tibetans in urban Eastern areas are outnumbered at least 2 to 1, however there are very few Chinese in rural areas.

Military occupancy increases Chinese population of Tibet, however they also reduce the Tibetan population in the region, thus increasing the proportion of Chinese to native Tibetans. Sources say that from 1952 to 1958, during the early stages of Chinese annexation of Tibet, the PLA killed over 10,000 Tibetans in Kanlho, and in Golog, from 1956 to 1964, the population halved from 140,000 to 70,000.

Neutrality 

Some publications claim that every Chinese immigration influx isn't with mal intent. The Cadre Transfer Policy wasn't an assimilation attempt because the number of Chinese immigrants was minimal compared to other periods; instead it was an attempt to promote economic development of the newly annexed region. Professionals were sent to the area in "low quantity but high quality". There are also claims that earlier Chinese migration was a natural phenomenon caused by the natural passing of time causing the replacing of their "babarian" culture.

See also
Sinicization of Tibet
Annexation of Tibet by the People's Republic of China

References

Tibet
Settlement schemes in Asia
Internal migration